Real Men may refer to:

 Real Men (film), a 1987 film
 Real Men (British TV series), a 2003 UK TV miniseries
 Real Man (TV series), also known as Real Men, a 2013 South Korean TV series
 Real Men (album), a 1991 album by John S. Hall and Kramer
 "Real Men" (song), a song by Joe Jackson

See also
 Real Man (disambiguation)
 Takes a Real Man, a Chinese TV variety show based on the South Korean series Real Man